Sir Richard Anthony Lloyd Jones KCB (born 1 August 1933) is a retired Welsh civil servant. He served as Permanent Secretary of the Welsh Office, 1985–93.

Lloyd-Jones was born in Sculcoates, Yorkshire, the son of Robert Lloyd Jones and Anne Page. He was educated at Long Dene School in Edenbridge and Nottingham High School, before earning an MA at Balliol College, Oxford.

He entered the Admiralty in 1957 as Assistant Private Secretary to the First Lord of the Admiralty, 1959–62. He served as Private Secretary to the Secretary of the Cabinet, 1969–70 and as Assistant Secretary at the Ministry of Defence, 1970–74. He joined the Welsh Office in 1974 as Under Secretary, 1974–78; Deputy Secretary, 1978–85; and Permanent Secretary, 1985–93.

He has also had several other prominent roles, including chairman of the Civil Service Benevolent Fund, 1987–93 and of the Arts Council of Wales, 1994–99; Member of the BBC General Advisory Council, 1994–96; and Vice-Chairman of the Prince of Wales' Committee, 1993–96.

He was appointed a Companion of the Order of the Bath (CB) in the 1981 New Year Honours and knighted in the same order (KCB) in the 1988 Birthday Honours.

He married in 1955, Patricia Avril Mary Richmond (died 2002) and had two daughters. He married secondly, in 2005, Helen Margaret Yewlett (née Lewis). He resides in Radyr, Cardiff.

References

1933 births
Living people
People from Sculcoates
People from Cardiff
Alumni of Balliol College, Oxford
Welsh civil servants
Permanent Under-Secretaries of State for Wales
People educated at Nottingham High School
Knights Commander of the Order of the Bath